This is a list of butterflies of Mexico. According to this list, there are 2,045 butterfly species present in Mexico.

Papilionidae

Baroniinae
Baronia brevicornis brevicornis – baronia
Baronia brevicornis rufodiscalis – baronia

Papilioninae

Troidini
Battus eracon – West-Mexican swallowtail
Battus ingenuus – Dyar's swallowtail
Battus laodamas copanae – green-patch swallowtail
Battus laodamas iopas – green-patch swallowtail
Battus lycidas – Cramer's swallowtail
Battus philenor acauda – Yucatán pipevine swallowtail
Battus philenor insularis – Revillagigedo pipevine swallowtail
Battus philenor orsua – Tres Marias pipevine swallowtail
Battus philenor philenor – pipevine swallowtail
Battus polydamas polydamas – Polydamas swallowtail
Parides alopius – white-dotted cattleheart
Parides anchises marthilia – Chiapas cattleheart
Parides childrenae childrenae – green-celled cattleheart
Parides erithalion polyzelus – variable cattleheart
Parides erithalion trichopus – variable cattleheart
Parides eurimedes mylotes – true cattleheart
Parides iphidamas iphidamas – Iphidamas cattleheart
Parides montezuma – Montezuma's cattleheart
Parides panares lycimenes – wedge-spotted cattleheart
Parides panares panares – wedge-spotted cattleheart
Parides photinus – pink-spotted cattleheart
Parides sesostris zestos – emerald-patched cattleheart

Leptocircini
Eurytides agesilaus fortis – short-lined kite-swallowtail
Eurytides agesilaus neosilaus – short-lined kite-swallowtail
Eurytides calliste calliste – yellow kite-swallowtail
Eurytides dioxippus lacandones – thick-bordered kite-swallowtail
Eurytides epidaus epidaus – Mexican kite-swallowtail
Eurytides epidaus fenochionis – Mexican kite-swallowtail
Eurytides epidaus tepicus – Mexican kite-swallowtail
Eurytides macrosilaus penthesilaus – five-striped kite-swallowtail
Eurytides marcellus – zebra swallowtail
Eurytides philolaus philolaus – dark kite-swallowtail
Eurytides salvini – Salvin's kite-swallowtail
Eurytides thyastes marchandii – orange kite-swallowtail
Eurytides thyastes occidentalis – orange kite-swallowtail
Mimoides ilus branchus – Ilus swallowtail
Mimoides ilus occiduus – Ilus swallowtail
Mimoides phaon phaon – variable swallowtail
Mimoides thymbraeus aconophos – white-crescent swallowtail
Mimoides thymbraeus thymbraeus – white-crescent swallowtail

Papilionini
Papilio alexiares alexiares – Mexican tiger swallowtail
Papilio alexiares garcia – Garcia tiger swallowtail
Papilio anchisiades idaeus – ruby-spotted swallowtail
Papilio androgeus epidaurus – Androgeus swallowtail
Papilio astyalus bajaensis – broad-banded swallowtail
Papilio astyalus pallas – broad-banded swallowtail
Papilio cresphontes – giant swallowtail
Papilio erostratus erostratinus – Erostratus swallowtail
Papilio erostratus erostratus – Erostratus swallowtail
Papilio erostratus vazquezae – Erostratus swallowtail
Papilio esperanza – Esperanza swallowtail
Papilio eurymedon – pale tiger swallowtail
Papilio garamas abderus – magnificent swallowtail
Papilio garamas baroni – magnificent swallowtail
Papilio garamas electryon – magnificent swallowtail
Papilio garamas garamas – magnificent swallowtail
Papilio glaucus glaucus – eastern tiger swallowtail
Papilio indra pergamus – Indra swallowtail
Papilio machaon bairdii – Baird's swallowtail
Papilio multicaudata grandiosus – two-tailed tiger swallowtail
Papilio multicaudata multicaudata – two-tailed tiger swallowtail
Papilio multicaudata pusillus – two-tailed tiger swallowtail
Papilio ornythion – ornythion swallowtail
Papilio palamedes leontis – Palamedes swallowtail
Papilio pilumnus – three-tailed tiger swallowtail
Papilio polyxenes asterius – black swallowtail
Papilio polyxenes coloro – desert swallowtail
Papilio rogeri pharnaces – pink-spotted swallowtail
Papilio rogeri rogeri – pink-spotted swallowtail
Papilio rutulus – western tiger swallowtail
Papilio thoas autocles – Thoas swallowtail
Papilio torquatus mazai – Torquatus swallowtail
Papilio torquatus tolus – Torquatus swallowtail
Papilio victorinus morelius – victorine swallowtail
Papilio victorinus victorinus – victorine swallowtail
Papilio zelicaon – anise swallowtail

Pieridae

Dismorphinae
Dismorphia amphione isolda – tiger mimic-white
Dismorphia amphione lupita – tiger mimic-white
Dismorphia amphione praxinoe – tiger mimic-white
Dismorphia crisia alvarezi – crisia mimic-white
Dismorphia crisia virgo – crisia mimic-white
Dismorphia eunoe chamula – Eunoe mimic-white
Dismorphia eunoe eunoe – Eunoe mimic-white
Dismorphia eunoe popoluca – Eunoe mimic-white
Dismorphia theucharila fortunata – clearwinged mimic-white
Enantia albania albania – costa-spotted mimic-white
Enantia jethys – Jethys mimic-white
Enantia lina marion – white mimic-white
Enantia lina virna – white mimic-white
Enantia mazai diazi – De la Maza's mimic-white
Enantia mazai mazai – De la Maza's mimic-white
Lieinix lala lala – dark mimic-white
Lieinix lala turrenti – dark mimic-white
Lieinix neblina – Guerrero mimic-white
Lieinix nemesis atthis – frosted mimic-white
Lieinix nemesis nayaritensis – frosted mimic-white
Pseudopieris nehemia irma – clean mimic-white

Coliadinae
Abaeis nicippe – sleepy orange
Anteos clorinde – white angled-sulphur
Anteos maerula – yellow angled-sulphur
Aphrissa boisduvalii – Boisduval's sulphur
Aphrissa schausi – Schaus' sulphur
Aphrissa statira statira – statira sulphur
Colias eurytheme – orange sulphur
Colias harfordii – Harford's sulphur
Colias philodice eriphyle – clouded sulphur
Colias philodice guatemalena – Guatemalan sulphur
Eurema agave millerorum – agave yellow
Eurema albula celata – white yellow
Eurema boisduvaliana – Boisduval's yellow
Eurema daira eugenia – barred yellow
Eurema daira sidonia – barred yellow
Eurema mexicana mexicana – Mexican yellow
Eurema salome jamapa – Salome yellow
Eurema xantochlora xanthochlora – tropical yellow
Kricogonia lyside – lyside sulphur
Nathalis iole – dainty sulphur
Phoebis agarithe agarithe – large orange sulphur
Phoebis agarithe fisheri – large orange sulphur
Phoebis argante – apricot sulphur
Phoebis neocypris virgo – tailed sulphur
Phoebis philea philea – orange-barred sulphur
Phoebis sennae marcellina – cloudless sulphur
Prestonia clarki – West-Mexican sulphur
Pyrisitia dina westwoodi – dina yellow
Pyrisitia lisa centralis – little yellow
Pyrisitia nise nelphe – mimosa yellow
Pyrisitia proterpia – tailed orange
Rhabdodryas trite – straight-lined sulphur
Zerene cesonia cesonia – southern dogface
Zerene eurydice – California dogface

Pierinae

Anthocharidini
Anthocharis cethura bajacalifornia – desert orangetip
Anthocharis cethura cethura – desert orangetip
Anthocharis cethura pima – Pima orangetip
Anthocharis lanceolata australis – gray marble
Anthocharis lanceolata desertolimbus – gray marble
Anthocharis limonea – Mexican orangetip
Anthocharis midea texana – falcate orangetip
Anthocharis sara sara – Sara orangetip
Anthocharis thoosa inghami – southwestern orangetip
Euchloe guaymasensis – Sonoran marble
Euchloe hyantis – desert marble
Euchloe lotta – desert marble
Hesperocharis costaricensis pasion – Costa Rican white
Hesperocharis crocea crocea – orange white
Hesperocharis crocea jaliscana – orange white
Hesperocharis graphites avivolans – marbled white
Hesperocharis graphites graphites – marbled white

Pierini
Archonias brassolis approximata – cattleheart white
Ascia monuste monuste – great southern white
Ascia monuste raza – great southern white
Catasticta flisa flisa – narrow-banded dartwhite
Catasticta flisa flisandra – narrow-banded dartwhite
Catasticta flisa flisella – narrow-banded dartwhite
Catasticta nimbice nimbice – Mexican dartwhite
Catasticta nimbice ochracea – Mexican dartwhite
Catasticta teutila flavifasciata – pure-banded dartwhite
Catasticta teutila teutila – pure-banded dartwhite
Charonias eurytele nigrescens – tiger white
Eucheira socialis socialis – social white
Eucheira socialis westwoodi – social white
Ganyra howarthi – Howarth's white
Ganyra josephina josepha – giant white
Ganyra phaloe tiburtia – Godart's white
Glutophrissa drusilla tenuis – Florida white
Itaballia demophile centralis – black-banded white
Itaballia pandiosa kicaha – brown-bordered white
Leptophobia aripa elodia – mountain white
Melete lycimnia isandra – creamy white
Melete polyhymnia florinda – golden white
Melete polyhymnia serrana – golden white
Neophasia terlooii – Mexican pine white
Pereute charops charops – darkened white
Pereute charops leonilae – darkened white
Pereute charops nigricans – darkened white
Pereute charops sphocra – darkened white
Perrhybris pamela chajulensis – Chiapan white
Perrhybris pamela mapa – Chiapan white
Pieriballia viardi viardi – viardi white
Pieris rapae rapae – cabbage white
Pontia beckerii – Becker's white
Pontia protodice – checkered white
Pontia sisymbrii sisymbrii – spring white
Pontia sisymbrii transversa – spring white

Lycaenidae

Miletinae
Feniseca tarquinius tarquinius – harvester (expected)

Lycaeninae
Iophanus pyrrhias – Guatemalan copper
Lycaena arota arota – tailed copper
Lycaena gorgon gorgon – gorgon copper
Lycaena helloides – purplish copper
Lycaena hermes – Hermes copper
Lycaena xanthoides xanthoides – great copper

Theclinae

Theclini
Habrodais grunus grunus – golden hairstreak
Habrodais poodiae – Baja hairstreak
Hypaurotis crysalus crysalus – Colorado hairstreak

Eumaeini
Allosmaitia strophius – Strophius hairstreak
Apuecla maeonis – Maeonis hairstreak
Apuecla upupa – upupa hairstreak
Arawacus hypocrita – pallid hairstreak
Arawacus jada – creamy hairstreak
Arawacus sito – fine-lined hairstreak
Arawacus togarna – togarna hairstreak
Arcas cypria – Mexican arcas
Arcas imperialis – imperial arcas
Arumecla galliena – red-based groundstreak
Arumecla nisaee – nisaee groundstreak
Atlides carpasia – jeweled hairstreak
Atlides gaumeri – white-tipped hairstreak
Atlides halesus corcorani – great blue hairstreak
Atlides inachus – spying hairstreak
Atlides polybe – black-veined hairstreak
Atlides rustan – Rustan hairstreak
Aubergina hicetas – Hicetas hairstreak
Aubergina paetus – Paetus hairstreak
Aubergina species – Bob's hairstreak
Brangas carthaea – green-spotted brangas
Brangas coccineifrons – black-veined brangas
Brangas getus – bright brangas
Brangas neora – common brangas
Brevianta busa – white-scalloped hairstreak
Brevianta tolmides – white-frosted hairstreak
Callophrys affinis apama – Apama hairstreak
Callophrys affinis chapmani – Apama hairstreak
Callophrys augustinus annettae – brown elfin
Callophrys augustinus iroides – brown elfin
Callophrys dospassosi dospassosi – Dos Passos' hairstreak
Callophrys dospassosi searsi – Dos Passos' hairstreak
Callophrys eryphon eryphon – western pine elfin
Callophrys estela – Estela hairstreak
Callophrys gryneus "nelsoni" – Guadalupe Island juniper hairstreak
Callophrys gryneus castalis – Texas juniper hairstreak
Callophrys gryneus cedrosensis – Cedar Island juniper hairstreak
Callophrys gryneus loki – Loki juniper hairstreak
Callophrys gryneus siva – Siva juniper hairstreak
Callophrys gryneus turkingtoni – Chihuahuan juniper hairstreak
Callophrys guatemalena – Guatemalan hairstreak
Callophrys henrici solatus – Henry's elfin
Callophrys mcfarlandi – Sandia hairstreak
Callophrys perplexa perplexa – lotus hairstreak
Callophrys scaphia – Chiapas hairstreak
Callophrys spinetorum millerorum – thicket hairstreak
Callophrys spinetorum spinetorum – thicket hairstreak
Callophrys xami texami – xami hairstreak
Callophrys xami xami – xami hairstreak
Calycopis atnius – atnius groundstreak
Calycopis calus – calus groundstreak
Calycopis cerata – cerata groundstreak
Calycopis clarina – white-striped groundstreak
Calycopis demonassa – shining groundstreak
Calycopis drusilla – Drusilla groundstreak
Calycopis isobeon – dusky-blue groundstreak
Calycopis origo – origo groundstreak
Calycopis pisis – Pisis groundstreak
Calycopis tamos – Tamos hairstreak
Calycopis trebula – Trebula groundstreak
Calycopis xeneta – brilliant groundstreak
Camissecla vespasianus – Vespasianus groundstreak
Celmia celmus – celmus hairstreak
Celmia conoveria – conoveira hairstreak
Chalybs hassan – Hassan greenstreak
Chalybs janias – Janias greenstreak
Chlorostrymon simaethis sarita – silver-banded hairstreak
Chlorostrymon telea telea – Telea hairstreak
Contrafacia ahola – half-blue hairstreak
Contrafacia bassania – white-etched hairstreak
Contrafacia imma – imma hairstreak
Cyanophrys agricolor – stained greenstreak
Cyanophrys amyntor – Amyntor greenstreak
Cyanophrys fusius – brown greenstreak
Cyanophrys goodsoni – Goodson's greenstreak
Cyanophrys herodotus – tropical greenstreak
Cyanophrys longula – mountain greenstreak
Cyanophrys miserablis – Clench's greenstreak
Dicya carnica – carnica hairstreak
Dicya dicaea – Dicaea hairstreak
Dicya lollia – Lollia hairstreak
Dicya lucagus – lucagus hairstreak
Electrostrymon hugon – ruddy hairstreak
Electrostrymon joya – muted hairstreak
Electrostrymon mathewi – Mathew's groundstreak
Enos falerina – Falerina hairstreak
Enos thara – Thara hairstreak
Erora aura – Aura hairstreak
Erora carla – Carla hairstreak
Erora gabina – Gabina hairstreak
Erora muridosca – muridosca hairstreak
Erora nitetis – Nitetis hairstreak
Erora opisena – opisena hairstreak
Erora quaderna – Arizona hairstreak
Erora subflorens – emerald hairstreak
Eumaeus childrenae – great cycadian
Eumaeus toxea – Mexican cycadian
Evenus batesii – Bates' hairstreak
Evenus coronata – crowned hairstreak
Evenus regalis – regal hairstreak
Gargina caninius – caninus hairstreak
Gargina gargophia – gargophia hairstreak
Gargina gnosia – gnosia hairstreak
Gargina thoria – thoria hairstreak
Hypostrymon asa – Asa hairstreak
Hypostrymon critola – Sonoran hairstreak
Iaspis castitas – castitas hairstreak
Iaspis temesa – Temesa hairstreak
Iaspis species – Robert's hairstreak
Ignata gadira – gadira hairstreak
Ignata norax – Norax hairstreak
Ignata species – quasigadira hairstreak
Ipidecla miadora – West-Mexican ipidecla
Ipidecla schausi – Schaus' ipidecla
Janthecla janthina – janthina hairstreak
Janthecla janthodonia – janthodonia hairstreak
Janthecla rocena – Rocena hairstreak
Kolana ligurina – ligurina hairstreak
Kolana lyde – Lyde hairstreak
Lamprospilus arza – single-banded groundstreak
Lamprospilus collucia – two-toned groundstreak
Lamprospilus sethon – large groundstreak
Lamprospilus tarpa – double-banded groundstreak
Lamprospilusspecies – Robbins' groundstreak
Laothus barajo – barajo hairstreak
Laothus erybathis – erybathis hairstreak
Laothus oceia – oceia hairstreak
Lathecla latagus – latagus hairstreak
Lathecla species – quasilatagus hairstreak
Magnastigma elsa – Elsa hairstreak
Megathecla cupentus – cupenthus hairstreak
Micandra cyda – cyda hairstreak
Micandra tongida – tongida hairstreak
Michaelus hecate – Hecate hairstreak
Michaelus ira – ira hairstreak
Michaelus jebus – variegated hairstreak
Michaelus phoenissa – two-banded hairstreak
Michaelus thordesa – thordesa hairstreak
Ministrymon arola – arola ministreak
Ministrymon azia – gray ministreak
Ministrymon cleon – Cleon ministreak
Ministrymon clytie – Clytie ministreak
Ministrymon inoa – Veracruzan ministreak
Ministrymon leda – Leda ministreak
Ministrymon phrutus – purple-webbed ministreak
Ministrymon una scopas – pale ministreak
Ministrymon zilda – square-spotted ministreak
Ministrymon species – quasileda ministreak
Ministrymon species – Yucatán ministreak
Mithras species – pale-patched hairstreak
Nesiostrymon calchinia – calachinia hairstreak
Nesiostrymon celona – Celona hairstreak
Nesiostrymon dodava – dodava hairstreak
Nicolaea dolium – dolium hairstreak
Nicolaea heraldica – heraldica hairstreak
Nicolaea ophia – ophia hairstreak
Nicolaea velina – garnet-patched hairstreak
Nicolaea species – Oaxacan hairstreak
Ocaria arpoxais – blue-spotted hairstreak
Ocaria clenchi – Clench's hairstreak
Ocaria ocrisia – black hairstreak
Ocaria petelina – Petelina hairstreak
Ocaria thales – Thales blackstreak
Ocaria species – Robbins' hairstreak
Oenomaus atesa – atesa hairstreak
Oenomaus ortygnus – aquamarine hairstreak
Ostrinotes halciones – halciones hairstreak
Ostrinotes keila – keila hairstreak
Ostrinotes species – cryptic hairstreak
Paiwarria antinous – Felders' hairstreak
Paiwarria umbratus – thick-tailed hairstreak
Panthiades bathildis – zebra-striped hairstreak
Panthiades bitias – Bitias hairstreak
Panthiades ochus – Ochus hairstreak
Panthiades phaleros – Phaleros hairstreak
Parrhasius moctezuma – Mexican-M hairstreak
Parrhasius orgia – variable hairstreak
Parrhasius polibetes – black-spot hairstreak
Phaeostrymon alcestis alcestis – soapberry hairstreak
Phaeostrymon alcestis oslari – soapberry hairstreak
Pseudolycaena damo – sky-blue hairstreak
Rekoa marius – Marius hairstreak
Rekoa meton – Meton hairstreak
Rekoa palegon – gold-bordered hairstreak
Rekoa stagira – smudged hairstreak
Rekoa zebina – Zebina hairstreak
Satyrium auretorum spadix – gold-hunter's hairstreak
Satyrium californica californica – California hairstreak
Satyrium favonius autolycus – southern hairstreak
Satyrium ilavia – Ilavia hairstreak
Satyrium polingi – Poling's hairstreak
Satyrium saepium chalcis – hedgerow hairstreak
Satyrium sylvinus desertorum – sylvan hairstreak
Satyrium tetra – mountain mahogany hairstreak
Semonina semones – semones hairstreak
Siderus leucophaeus – white-spotted hairstreak
Siderus philinna – bold-spotted hairstreak
Strephonota ambrax – Ambrax hairstreak
Strephonota syedra – Syedra hairstreak
Strephonota tephraeus – pearly-gray hairstreak
Strymon albata – white scrub-hairsreak
Strymon alea – Lacey's scrub-hairstreak
Strymon astiocha – gray-spotted scrub-hairstreak
Strymon bazochii – lantana scrub-hairstreak
Strymon bebrycia – red-lined scrub-hairstreak
Strymon cestri – tailless scrub-hairstreak
Strymon gabatha – great scrub-hairstreak
Strymon istapa clarionica – mallow scrub-hairstreak
Strymon istapa clenchi – mallow scrub-hairstreak
Strymon istapa istapa – mallow scrub-hairstreak
Strymon istapa socorroica – mallow scrub-hairstreak
Strymon megarus – Megarus scrub-hairstreak
Strymon clarionensis – gray hairstreak
Strymon melinus franki – gray hairstreak
Strymon melinus pudica – gray hairstreak
Strymon mulucha – mottled scrub-hairstreak
Strymon rufofusca – red-crescent scrub-hairstreak
Strymon serapio – bromeliad scrub-hairstreak
Strymon yojoa – Yojoa scrub-hairstreak
Strymon ziba – Ziba scrub-hairstreak
Strymon species – puente colossal hairstreak
Symbiopsis species – Colima hairstreak
Temecla heraclides – Heraclides hairstreak
Temecla paron – Paron hairstreak
Thaeides theia – brown-barred hairstreak
Theclopsis mycon – mycon hairstreak
Theorema eumenia – pale-tipped cycadian
Thepytus echelta – velvet hairstreak
Thereus cithonius – pale-lobed hairstreak
Thereus lausus – Lausus hairstreak
Thereus oppia – Oppia hairstreak
Thereus orasus – crimson-spot hairstreak
Thereus ortalus – Ortalus hairstreak
Theritas augustinula – augustinula hairstreak
Theritas hemon – pale-clubbed hairstreak
Theritas lisus – Lisus hairstreak
Theritas mavors – deep-green hairstreak
Theritas theocritus – pearly hairstreak
Tmolus crolinus – crolinus hairstreak
Tmolus cydrara – Cydrara hairstreak
Tmolus echion echiolus – red-spotted hairstreak
Tmolus mutina – Mutina midistreak
Ziegleria ceromia – ceromia groundstreak
Ziegleria denarius – coppery groundstreak
Ziegleria guzanta – orange-crescent groundstreak
Ziegleria hesperitis – hesperitis groundstreak
Ziegleria hoffmani – Hoffmann's groundstreak
Ziegleria micandriana – micandriana groundstreak
Ziegleria syllis – sky-blue groundstreak

Polyommatinae
Brephidium exilis exilis – western pygmy-blue
Brephidium exilis yucateca – western pygmy-blue
Celastrina echo subspecies – Baja azure
Celastrina echo cinerea – southwestern azure
Celastrina echo echo – Pacific azure
Celastrina gozora – Mexican azure
Cupido amyntula amyntula – western tailed-blue
Cupido amyntula herri – western tailed-blue
Cupido comyntas texana – eastern tailed-blue
Echinargus huntingtoni hannoides – Huntington's blue
Echinargus isola – Reakirt's blue
Euphilotes bernardino bernardino – Bernardino blue
Euphilotes bernardino garthi – Cedar Island Bernardino blue
Euphilotes bernardino martini – Martin's Bernardino blue
Euphilotes enoptes cryptorufes – cryptorufes dotted blue
Euphilotes enoptes dammersi – Dammers dotted blue
Euphilotes rita rita – Rita's blue
Glaucopsyche lygdamus arizonensis – silvery blue
Glaucopsyche lygdamus australis – silvery blue
Glaucopsyche lygdamus maritima – silvery blue
Glaucopsyche piasus umbrosa – arrowhead blue
Hemiargus ceraunus astenidas – Ceraunus blue
Hemiargus ceraunus gyas – Ceraunus blue
Leptotes cassius cassidula – Cassius blue
Leptotes marina – marine blue
Philotes sonorensis sonorensis – Sonoran blue
Philotiella speciosa speciosa – small blue
Icaricia acmon – Acmon blue
Icaricia icarioides buchholzi – Boisduval's blue
Icaricia icarioides evius – Boisduval's blue
Icaricia lupini monticola – monticola blue
Icaricia lupini texanus – Texas blue
Icaricia saepiolus hilda – greenish blue
Plebejus melissa mexicana – Melissa blue
Plebejus melissa paradoxa – Melissa blue
Zizula cyna – cyna blue

Riodinidae

Euselasiinae
Euselasia argentea – orange-spotted euselasia
Euselasia aurantiaca aurantiaca – fiery euselasia
Euselasia aurantiaca aurum – fiery euselasia
Euselasia cataleuca – black-edged euselasia
Euselasia chrysippe – golden euselasia
Euselasia eubule – dusky euselasia
Euselasia eucrates leucorrhoa – Godman's euselasia
Euselasia eurypus – tee-banded euselasia
Euselasia hieronymi hieronymi – red-rayed euselasia
Euselasia inconspicua – inconspicuous euselasia
Euselasia mystica – mystical euselasia
Euselasia pontasis – pontasis euselasia
Euselasia procula – orange-costa euselasia
Euselasia pusilla mazai – pearly euselasia
Euselasia pusilla pusilla – pearly euselasia
Euselasia regipennis regipennis – purple-topped euselasia
Euselasia sergia sergia – Sergia euselasia
Hades noctula – white-rayed metalmark

Riodininae
Adelotypa eudocia – tiny metalmark
Ancyluris inca inca – Inca metalmark
Ancyluris jurgensenii jurgensenii – costa-spotted metalmark
Anteros carausius – carousing anteros
Anteros chrysoprasta roratus – elegant anteros
Anteros formosus micon – black-bellied anteros
Apodemia chisosensis – Chisos metalmark
Apodemia duryi – Dury's metalmark
Apodemia hepburni hepburni – Hepburn's metalmark
Apodemia hepburni remota – Hepburn's metalmark
Apodemia hypoglauca hypoglauca – falcate metalmark
Apodemia hypoglauca wellingi – falcate metalmark
Apodemia mejicanus deserti – desert Mexican metalmark
Apodemia mejicanus maxima – giant Mexican metalmark
Apodemia mejicanus mejicanus – Mexican metalmark
Apodemia multiplaga – narrow-winged metalmark
Apodemia murphyi – Murphy's metalmark
Apodemia nais – nais metalmark
Apodemia palmerii arizona – Palmer's metalmark
Apodemia palmerii australis – Palmer's metalmark
Apodemia palmerii palmerii – Palmer's metalmark
Apodemia phyciodoides – crescent metalmark
Apodemia virgulti dialeuca – Baja metalmark
Apodemia virgulti peninsularis – peninsular metalmark
Apodemia virgulti virgulti – Behr's metalmark
Apodemia walkeri – Walker's metalmark
Argyrogrammana stilbe holosticta – dotted metalmark
Baeotis barce barce – Barce metalmark
Baeotis sulphurea macularia – sulphur metalmark
Baeotis sulphurea sulphurea – sulphur metalmark
Baeotis zonata zonata – bumblebee metalmark
Behemothia godmanii – Godman's metalmark
Brachyglenis dodone – orange-bellied metalmark
Calephelis acapulcoensis – Acapulco calephelis
Calephelis argyrodines – argyrodines calephelis
Calephelis arizonensis – Arizona calephelis
Calephelis azteca – Aztec calephelis
Calephelis bajaensis – Baja calephelis
Calephelis browni – Brown's calephelis
Calephelis costaricicola – Costa Rican calephelis
Calephelis dreisbachi – Dreisbach's calephelis
Calephelis freemani – Freeman's calephelis
Calephelis fulmen – fulmen calephelis
Calephelis huasteca – Huastecan calephelis
Calephelis laverna laverna – Laverna calephelis
Calephelis matheri – Mather's calephelis
Calephelis maya – Mayan calephelis
Calephelis mexicana – Mexican calephelis
Calephelis montezuma – Montezuma's calephelis
Calephelis nemesis australis – fatal calephelis
Calephelis nemesis dammersi – fatal calephelis
Calephelis nemesis nemesis – fatal calephelis
Calephelis perditalis donahuei – rounded calephelis
Calephelis perditalis perditalis – rounded calephelis
Calephelis rawsoni – Rawson's calephelis
Calephelis sacapulas – Sacapulas calephelis
Calephelis sinaloensis nuevoleon – Sinaloan calephelis
Calephelis sinaloensis sinaloensis – Sinaloan calephelis
Calephelis sixola – greater calephelis
Calephelis stallingsi – Stallings' calephelis
Calephelis tikal – Tikal calephelis
Calephelis velutina – dark calephelis
Calephelis wellingi – Welling's calephelis
Calephelis wrighti – Wright's calephelis
Calephelis yautepequensis – Morelos calephelis
Calephelis yucatana – Yucatán calephelis
Calicosama lilina – white-posted metalmark
Calociasma nycteus – brown-and-white metalmark
Calospila pelarge – Pelarge metalmark
Calydna sturnula – sturnula metalmark
Calydna venusta venusta – venusta metalmark
Caria domitianus vejento – small-patched metalmark
Caria ino ino – red-bordered metalmark
Caria ino melicerta – red-bordered metalmark
Caria mantinea lampeto – Lampeto metalmark
Caria melino – Melino metalmark
Caria rhacotis – Honduran metalmark
Caria stillaticia – gold-headed metalmark
Chalodeta chaonitis – orange-stitched metalmark
Chamaelimnas cydonia – Cydonia metalmark
Chimastrum argentea argentea – silvery metalmark
Cremna actoris – actoris metalmark
Cremna thasus subrutila – Thasus metalmark
Emesia cypria paphia – orange-striped emesis
Emesis ares – Ares emesis
Emesis arnacis – Miahuatlan emesis
Emesis aurimna – white-spotted emesis
Emesis emesia – curve-winged emesis
Emesis fatimella nobilata – fatimella emesis
Emesis liodes – liodes emesis
Emesis lupina lupina – lupina emesis
Emesis mandana furor – great emesis
Emesis ocypore aethalia – dark emesis
Emesis poeas – thorn-scrub emesis
Emesis saturata – Oaxacan emesis
Emesis tegula – tegula emesis
Emesis tenedia – falcate emesis
Emesis toltec – Toltec emesis
Emesis vimena – Schaus' emesis
Emesis vulpina – pale emesis
Emesis zela cleis – Zela emesis
Emesis zela zela – Zela emesis
Esthemopsis alicia alicia – Alicia's metalmark
Esthemopsis clonia – Clonia metalmark
Esthemopsis pherephatte perephatte – Godart's metalmark
Eurybia elvina elvina – blind eurybia
Eurybia lycisca – blue-winged eurybia
Eurybia patrona persona – great eurybia
Exoplisia azuleja – occidental metalmark
Exoplisia hypochalybe hypochalybe – many-banded metalmark
Hermathena oweni – white metalmark
Hypophylla sudias sudias – white-banded metalmark
Hypophylla zeurippa – zeurippa metalmark
Isapis agyrtus hera – yellow-based metalmark
Juditha caucana – Caucana metalmark
Lamphiotes velazquezi – brown-tipped metalmark
Lasaia agesilas callaina – shining-blue lasaia
Lasaia maria anna – blue-gray lasaia
Lasaia maria maria – blue-gray lasaia
Lasaia meris – variegated lasaia
Lasaia sessilis – gray lasaia
Lasaia sula peninsularis – blue lasaia
Lasaia sula sula – blue lasaia
Lemonias caliginea – Butler's metalmark
Leucochimona lepida nivalis – satyr metalmark
Leucochimona vestalis vestalis – Vestalis metalmark
Lyropteryx lyra cleadas – lyra metalmark
Melanis acroleuca acroleuca – white-rayed metalmark
Melanis acroleuca huasteca – white-tipped metalmark
Melanis cephise – white-tipped metalmark
Melanis pixe pixe – pixie
Menander menander purpurata – Menander metalmark
Menander pretus picta – Cramer's metalmark
Mesene croceella – Guatemalan metalmark
Mesene leucopus – white-legged metalmark
Mesene margaretta margaretta – zebra-tipped metalmark
Mesene oriens – Oriens metalmark
Mesene phareus – cell-barred metalmark
Mesene silaris – yellow metalmark
Mesosemia gaudiolum – gaudy eyed-metalmark
Mesosemia gemina – turquoise eyed-metalmark
Mesosemia lamachus – purple-washed eyed-metalmark
Napaea eucharila picina – white-stitched metalmark
Napaea theages theages – white-spotted metalmark
Necyria larunda – Duellona metalmark
Notheme erota diadema – tawny metalmark
Nymphidium ascolia ascolia – creamy metalmark
Nymphidium onaeum – Hewitson's metalmark
Pachythone gigas gigas – Gigas metalmark
Panaropsis elegans – fire-banded metalmark
Periplacis glaucoma isthmica – glaucoma metalmark
Perophthalma lasus – Lasus metalmark
Pheles eulesca – Dyar's metalmark
Pheles melanchroia – melancholy metalmark
Pheles strigosa strigosa – strigosa metalmark
Pirascca tyriotes – golden-banded metalmark
Pseudonymphidia agave agave – agave metalmark
Pseudonymphidia clearista – clearista metalmark
Rhetus arcius beutelspacheri – long-tailed metalmark
Rhetus arcius thia – long-tailed metalmark
Rhetus periander naevianus – Periander metalmark
Sarota chrysus – Stoll's sarota
Sarota craspediodonta – Veracruzan sarota
Sarota estrada estrada – Schaus' sarota
Sarota gamelia gamelia – Panamanian sarota
Sarota gyas – Guyanese sarota
Sarota myrtea – Godman's sarota
Sarota psaros psaros – Guatemalan sarota
Setabis lagus jansoni – northern setabis
Symmachia accusatrix – accused metalmark
Symmachia probetor championi – Champion's metalmark
Symmachia rubina rubina – Rubina metalmark
Symmachia triclor – tricolored metalmark
Synargis mycone – rusty metalmark
Synargis nymphidioides septentrionalis – greater metalmark
Synargis ochra – ochra metalmark
Theope bacenis – curve-lined theope
Theope barea – Panamanian theope
Theope cratylus – scallop-patched theope
Theope devriesi – DeVries' theope
Theope eupolis – Veracruzan theope
Theope pedias – yellow-bottomed theope
Theope phaeo – falcate theope
Theope pieridoides – white theope
Theope pseudopedias – Hall's theope
Theope publius incompositus – shaded theope
Theope villai – West-Mexican theope
Theope virgilius – blue-based theope
Thisbe irenea belides – Irenia metalmark
Thisbe lycorias lycorias – banner metalmark
Voltinia danforthi – ancient metalmark
Voltinia umbra – quilted metalmark

Nymphalidae

Libytheinae
Libytheana carinenta larvata – American snout
Libytheana carinenta mexicana – American snout
Libytheana carinenta streckeri – American snout

Danainae

Danaini
Anetia thirza thirza – cloud-forest king
Danaus eresimus montezuma – soldier
Danaus gilippus thersippus – queen
Danaus plexippus plexippus – monarch
Lycorea halia atergatis – tiger mimic-queen
Lycorea ilione albescens – clearwing mimic-queen

Ithomiini
Aeria eurimedia pacifica – Pacific tigerwing
Callithomia hezia hedila – hezia clearwing
Callithomia hezia wellingi – hezia clearwing
Ceratinia tutia – tutia clearwing
Dircenna dero – dero clearwing
Dircenna jemina – Jemina clearwing
Dircenna klugii – Klug's clearwing
Episcada salvinia portilla – rusted Salvin's clearwing
Episcada salvinia salvinia – Salvin's clearwing
Godyris nero – Nero clearwing
Godyris zavaleta sosunga – variegated clearwing
Greta andromica lyra – lyra clearwing
Greta annette annette – white-spotted clearwing
Greta annette moschion – rusted white-spotted clearwing
Greta morgane morgane – rusty clearwing
Greta morgane oto – darkened rusty clearwing
Hypoleria lavinia cassotis – Cassotis clearwing
Hyposcada virginiana virginiana – Virginiana clearwing
Hypothyris euclea valora – euclea tigerwing
Hypothyris lycaste dionaea – Lycaste tigerwing
Ithomia leila – Leila's clearwing
Ithomia patilla – Patilla clearwing
Mechanitis lysimnia utemaia – lysimnia tigerwing
Mechanitis menapis doryssus – menapis tigerwing
Mechanitis polymnia lycidice – Polymnia tigerwing
Melinaea lilis flavicans – mimic tigerwing
Melinaea lilis imitata – mimic tigerwing
Napeogenes tolosa tolosa – Tolosa tigerwing
Oleria paula – Paula's clearwing
Oleria zea diazi – rusted zea clearwing
Oleria zea zea – zea clearwing
Olyras theon – rusty tigerwing
Pteronymia alcmena – Alcmena clearwing
Pteronymia artena artena – Artena clearwing
Pteronymia artena praedicta – rusted Artena clearwing
Pteronymia cotytto – Cotytto clearwing
Pteronymia parva – parva clearwing
Pteronymia rufocincta – West-Mexican clearwing
Pteronymia simplex fenochioi – simple clearwing
Pteronymia simplex timagenes – simple clearwing
Pteronymia species – Lamas' clearwing
Thyridia psidii melantho – Melantho tigerwing
Tithorea harmonia hippothous – Harmonia tigerwing
Tithorea harmonia salvadoris – Harmonia tigerwing
Tithorea tarricina duenna – cream-spotted tigerwing

Limenitidinae
Adelpha barnesia leucas – Leucas sister
Adelpha basiloides – spot-celled sister
Adelpha boeotia oberthurii – Oberthur's sister
Adelpha bredowii – Mexican sister
Adelpha californica – California sister
Adelpha cocala lorzae – Lorza's sister
Adelpha cytherea marcia – Marcia sister
Adelpha delinita utina – Utina sister
Adelpha diazi – Diaz's sister
Adelpha diocles creton – short-tailed sister
Adelpha donysa donysa – Donysa sister
Adelpha erotia erotia – Lerna sister
Adelpha erymanthis esperanza – Esperanza sister
Adelpha ethelda – Ethelda sister
Adelpha eulalia – Arizona sister
Adelpha felderi – Felder's sister
Adelpha fessonia fessonia – band-celled sister
Adelpha iphicleola iphicleola – iphicleola sister
Adelpha iphiclus iphiclus – Iphiclus sister
Adelpha leuceria leuceria – yellow-striped sister
Adelpha leucerioides leucerioides – tawny-striped sister
Adelpha lycorias melanthe – rayed sister
Adelpha malea fundania – Fundania sister
Adelpha milleri – Miller's sister
Adelpha naxia naxia – Naxia sister
Adelpha nea sentia – Sentia sister
Adelpha paraena massilia – Massilia sister
Adelpha paroeca paroeca – paroeca sister
Adelpha phylaca phylaca – phylaca sister
Adelpha pithys – pithy sister
Adelpha salmoneus salmonides – golden-banded sister
Adelpha salus – Salus sister
Adelpha seriphia godmani – Godman's sister
Adelpha serpa celerio – celerio sister
Limenitis archippus hoffmanni – viceroy
Limenitis archippus obsoleta – viceroy
Limenitis arthemis arizonensis – Arizona red-spotted purple
Limenitis lorquini powelli – Lorquin's admiral
Limenitis weidemeyerii siennafascia – Weidemeyer's admiral

Heliconiinae

Acraeini
Actinote anteas – anteas actinote
Actinote guatemalena guatemalena – Guatemalan actinote
Actinote guatemalena guerrerensis – Guatemalan actinote
Actinote guatemalena veraecrucis – Guatemalan actinote
Actinote lapitha calderoni – pale actinote
Actinote lapitha lapitha – pale actinote
Actinote melampeplos melampeplos – bow-winged actinote
Altinote ozomene nox – lamplight actinote
Altinote stratonice oaxaca – orange-disked actinote

Heliconiini
Agraulis vanillae incarnata – Gulf fritillary
Dione juno huascuma – Juno longwing
Dione moneta poeyii – Mexican silverspot
Dryadula phaetusa – banded longwing
Dryas iulia moderata – Julia
Eueides aliphera gracilis – Aliphera longwing
Eueides isabella eva – Isabella's longwing
Eueides isabella nigricornis – Isabella's longwing
Eueides lineata – thick-edged longwing
Eueides procula asidia – Procula longwing
Eueides vibilia vialis – vibilia longwing
Heliconius charithonia vazquezae – zebra longwing
Heliconius cydno galanthus – cydno longwing
Heliconius doris viridis – Doris longwing
Heliconius erato cruentus – crimson-patched longwing
Heliconius erato petiverana – crimson-patched longwing
Heliconius hecale fornarina – Hecale longwing
Heliconius hecale zuleika – Hecale longwing
Heliconius hecalesia octavia – five-spotted longwing
Heliconius hortense – Mexican longwing
Heliconius ismenius telchinia – tiger-striped longwing
Heliconius sapho leuce – Sapho longwing
Heliconius sara veraepacis – Sara longwing
Philaethria diatonica – northern green longwing

Argynnini
Euptoieta claudia – variegated fritillary
Euptoieta hegesia meridiania – Mexican fritillary
Speyeria callippe comstocki – callippe fritillary
Speyeria coronis semiramis – Coronis fritillary
Speyeria nokomis coerulescens – Nokomis fritillary
Speyeria nokomis melaena – Nokomis fritillary
Speyeria nokomis wenona – Nokomis fritillary

Apaturinae
Asterocampa celtis antonia – hackberry emperor
Asterocampa clyton louisa – tawny emperor
Asterocampa clyton texana – tawny emperor
Asterocampa idyja argus – cream-banded dusky emperor
Asterocampa leilia – Empress Leilia
Doxocopa callianira – Nicaraguan emperor
Doxocopa cyane mexicana – Mexican emperor
Doxocopa laure laure – silver emperor
Doxocopa laurentia cherubina – turquoise emperor
Doxocopa pavon theodora – pavon emperor

Biblidinae

Biblidini
Biblis hyperia aganisa – red rim

Eurytelini
Mestra amymone – northern mestra

Catonephelini
Catonephele cortesi – West-Mexican banner
Catonephele mexicana – East-Mexican banner
Catonephele numilia esite – blue-frosted banner
Catonephele numilia immaculata – blue-frosted banner
Eunica alcmena alcmena – dark purplewing
Eunica alpais excelsa – shining purplewing
Eunica caelina agusta – mottled purplewing
Eunica caelina agustina – mottled purplewing
Eunica malvina albida – rayed purplewing
Eunica malvina almae – rayed purplewing
Eunica monima – dingy purplewing
Eunica mygdonia omoa – blind purplewing
Eunica sydonia caresa – plain purplewing
Eunica tatila tatila – Florida purplewing
Eunica volumna venusia – blue-celled purplewing
Myscelia cyananthe cyananthe – blackened bluewing
Myscelia cyananthe diaziana – blackened bluewing
Myscelia cyananthe skinneri – blackened bluewing
Myscelia cyananthe streckeri – blackened bluewing
Myscelia cyaniris alvaradia – whitened bluewing
Myscelia cyaniris cyaniris – whitened bluewing
Myscelia ethusa chiapensis – Mexican bluewing
Myscelia ethusa cyanecula – Mexican bluewing
Myscelia ethusa ethusa – Mexican bluewing
Nessaea aglaura aglaura – northern nessaea

Ageroniini
Ectima erycinoides – northern ectima
Hamadryas amphinome mazai – red cracker
Hamadryas amphinome mexicana – red cracker
Hamadryas atlantis atlantis – black-patched cracker
Hamadryas atlantis lelaps – black-patched cracker
Hamadryas februa ferentina – gray cracker
Hamadryas feronia farinulenta – variable cracker
Hamadryas fornax fornacalia – orange cracker
Hamadryas glauconome glauconome – glaucous cracker
Hamadryas glauconome grisea – glaucous cracker
Hamadryas guatemalena guatemalena – Guatemalan cracker
Hamadryas guatemalena marmarice – Guatemalan cracker
Hamadryas iphthime joannae – brownish cracker
Hamadryas julitta – Yucatán cracker
Hamadryas laodamia saurites – starry cracker

Epiphelini
Bolboneura sylphis beatrix – variable banner
Bolboneura sylphis lacandona – variable banner
Bolboneura sylphis sylphis – variable banner
Bolboneura sylphis veracruzana – variable banner
Epiphile adrasta adrasta – common banner
Epiphile adrasta escalantei – common banner
Epiphile hermosa – beautiful banner
Epiphile iblis plutonia – plutonia banner
Nica flavilla bachiana – little banner
Pyrrhogyra edocla edocla – green-spotted banner
Pyrrhogyra edocla paradisea – green-spotted banner
Pyrrhogyra neaerea hypsenor – banded banner
Pyrrhogyra otolais otolais – double-banded banner
Temenis laothoe hondurensis – orange banner
Temenis laothoe quilapayunia – orange banner

Eubagini
Dynamine artemisia – small-eyed sailor
Dynamine ate – little sailor
Dynamine dyonis – blue-eyed sailor
Dynamine postverta mexicana – Mexican sailor
Dynamine theseus – white sailor

Callicorini
Callicore astarte casta – blue-stitched eighty-eight
Callicore astarte patelina – blue-stitched eighty-eight
Callicore lyca lyca – six-spotted eighty-eight
Callicore pitheas – two-eyed eighty-eight
Callicore texa heroica – yellow-rimmed eighty-eight
Callicore texa loxicha – yellow-rimmed eighty-eight
Callicore texa tacana – yellow-rimmed eighty-eight
Callicore texa titania – yellow-rimmed eighty-eight
Callicore tolima guatemalena – blue-and-orange eighty-eight
Callicore tolima pacifica – blue-and-orange eighty-eight
Callicore tolima tehuana – blue-and-orange eighty-eight
Diaethria anna anna – Anna's eighty-eight
Diaethria anna mixteca – Anna's eighty-eight
Diaethria anna salvadorensis – Anna's eighty-eight
Diaethria astala astala – Astala eighty-eight
Diaethria astala asteroide – Astala eighty-eight
Diaethria asteria – West-Mexican eighty-eight
Diaethria bacchis – white-patched eighty-eight
Diaethria pandama – orange-striped eighty-eight

Nymphalinae

Incertae sedis
Pycina zamba zelys – cloud-forest beauty

Cyrestini
Marpesia chiron marius – many-banded daggerwing
Marpesia corita corita – orange-banded daggerwing
Marpesia corita phiale – orange-banded daggerwing
Marpesia harmonia – pale daggerwing
Marpesia petreus – ruddy daggerwing
Marpesia zerynthia dentigera – waiter daggerwing

Coeini
Baeotus beotus – graphic beauty
Historis acheronta acheronta – tailed cecropian
Historis odius dious – Orion cecropian

Nymphalini
Aglais milberti subpallida – Milbert's tortoiseshell
Colobura annulata – new beauty
Colobura dirce dirce – Dirce beauty
Hypanartia dione disjuncta – banded mapwing
Hypanartia godmanii – Godman's mapwing
Hypanartia lethe – orange mapwing
Hypanartia trimaculata autumna – reddish mapwing
Nymphalis antiopa antiopa – mourning coak
Nymphalis californica – California tortoiseshell
Nymphalis cyanomelas – Mexican tortoiseshell
Polygonia g-argenteum – Mexican anglewing
Polygonia gracilis zephyrus – zephyr anglewing
Polygonia haroldii – spotless anglewing
Polygonia interrogationis – question mark
Polygonia satyrus satyrus – satyr anglewing
Smyrna blomfildia datis – Blomfild's beauty
Smyrna karwinskii – Karwinski's beauty
Tigridia acesta – tiger beauty
Vanessa annabella – West Coast lady
Vanessa atalanta rubria – red admiral
Vanessa cardui – painted lady
Vanessa virginiensis – American lady

Victorinini
Anartia fatima colima – banded peacock
Anartia fatima fatima – banded peacock
Anartia jatrophae luteipicta – white peacock
Siproeta epaphus epaphus – rusty-tipped page
Siproeta stelenes biplagiata – malachite
Siproeta superba superba – broad-banded page

Junoniini
Hypolimnas misippus – mimic
Junonia coenia coenia – northern buckeye
Junonia coenia grisea – northern buckeye
Junonia evarete nigrosuffusa – dark buckeye
Junonia genoveva – mangrove buckeye

Melitaeini
Anthanassa ardys ardys – Ardys crescent
Anthanassa ardys subota – Ardys crescent
Anthanassa argentea – chestnut crescent
Anthanassa atronia – brown crescent
Anthanassa dracaena phlegias – notched crescent
Anthanassa drusilla lelex – orange-patched crescent
Anthanassa drymaea – weak-banded crescent
Anthanassa nebulosa alexon – Alexon crescent
Anthanassa nebulosa nebulosa – nebulosa crescent
Anthanassa otanes cyno – blackened crescent
Anthanassa otanes oaxaca – blackened crescent
Anthanassa otanes otanes – blackened crescent
Anthanassa ptolyca amator – darkened crescent
Anthanassa ptolyca ptolyca – darkened crescent
Anthanassa sitalces cortes – montane crescent
Anthanassa sitalces sitalces – montane crescent
Anthanassa texana texana – Texan crescent
Anthanassa tulcis – pale-banded crescent
Castilia chiapaensis – Chiapas crescent
Castilia chinantlensis – Chinantlan crescent
Castilia eranites – mimic crescent
Castilia griseobasalis – gray-based crescent
Castilia myia – Mayan crescent
Castilia ofella – white-dotted crescent
Chlosyne acastus sabina – sagebrush checkerspot
Chlosyne californica – California patch
Chlosyne cyneas – Cyneas checkerspot
Chlosyne cynisca – Oaxacan checkerspot
Chlosyne definita anastasia – definite checkerspot
Chlosyne definita definita – definite checkerspot
Chlosyne ehrenbergii – white-rayed checkerspot
Chlosyne endeis endeis – banded checkerspot
Chlosyne endeis pardelina – banded checkerspot
Chlosyne erodyle erodyle – erodyle checkerspot
Chlosyne eumeda – Eumeda checkerspot
Chlosyne fulvia coronado – Fulvia checkerspot
Chlosyne fulvia fulvia – Fulvia checkerspot
Chlosyne gabbii gabbii – Gabb's checkerspot
Chlosyne gaudialis gaudialis – gaudy checkerspot
Chlosyne gaudialis wellingi – Welling's gaudy checkerspot
Chlosyne hippodrome hippodrome – simple checkerspot
Chlosyne janais gloriosa – glorious checkerspot
Chlosyne janais janais – crimson-patch checkerspot
Chlosyne janais marianna – crimson-patch checkerspot
Chlosyne kendallorum – Kendall's checkerspot
Chlosyne lacinia adjutrix – bordered patch
Chlosyne lacinia crocale – bordered patch
Chlosyne lacinia lacinia – bordered patch
Chlosyne leanira austrima – Leanira checkerspot
Chlosyne leanira wrightii – Leanira checkerspot
Chlosyne marina – marina checkerspot
Chlosyne melanarge – black checkerspot
Chlosyne melitaeoides – melitaeoides checkerspot
Chlosyne rosita browni – Rosita checkerspot
Chlosyne rosita mazarum – Rosita checkerspot
Chlosyne rosita montana – Rosita checkerspot
Chlosyne rosita riobalsensis – Rosita checkerspot
Chlosyne rosita rosita – Rosita checkerspot
Chlosyne theona bollii – Theona checkerspot
Chlosyne theona brocki – Theona checkerspot
Chlosyne theona chinatiensis – Theona checkerspot
Chlosyne theona minimus – Theona checkerspot
Chlosyne theona mullinsi – Theona checkerspot
Chlosyne theona thekla – Theona checkerspot
Chlosyne theona theona – Theona checkerspot
Dymasia dymas chara – tiny checkerspot
Dymasia dymas dymas – tiny checkerspot
Dymasia dymas imperialis – tiny checkerspot
Eresia clio clio – Clio crescent
Eresia phillyra phillyra – longwing crescent
Euphydryas anicia hermosa – Anicia checkerspot
Euphydryas chalcedona chalcedona – Chalcedon checkerspot
Euphydryas chalcedona hennei – Chalcedon checkerspot
Euphydryas editha quino – Edith's checkerspot, Quino checkerspot
Microtia elva elva – elf
Microtia elva horni – elf
Phyciodes graphica – Vesta crescent
Phyciodes mylitta arizonensis – Mylitta crescent
Phyciodes mylitta mexicana – Mylitta crescent
Phyciodes mylitta mylitta – Mylitta crescent
Phyciodes mylitta thebais – Mylitta crescent
Phyciodes pallescens – Mexican crescent
Phyciodes phaon jalapeno – Phaon crescent
Phyciodes phaon maya – Phaon crescent
Phyciodes phaon phaon – Phaon crescent
Phyciodes picta canace – painted crescent
Phyciodes tharos tharos – pearl crescent
Poladryas arachne nympha – Arachne checkerspot
Poladryas minuta minuta – dotted checkerspot
Tegosa anieta cluvia – black-bordered crescent
Tegosa anieta luka – black-bordered crescent
Tegosa claudina – Claudina crescent
Tegosa guatemalena – Guatemalan crescent
Tegosa nigrella nigrella – nigrella crescent
Texola anomalus – anomalus checkerspot
Texola coracara – coracara checkerspot
Texola elada elada – Elada checkerspot
Texola elada hepburni – Elada checkerspot
Texola elada ulrica – Elada checkerspot
Texola perse – Arizona checkerspot

Charaxinae

Anaeini
Anaea aidea – tropical leafwing
Anaea andria – goatweed leafwing
Consul electra adustus – pearly leafwing
Consul electra electra – pearly leafwing
Consul excellens excellens – black-veined leafwing
Consul excellens genini – black-veined leafwing
Consul fabius cecrops – tiger-striped leafwing
Fountainea eurypyle confusa – pointed leafwing
Fountainea eurypyle glanzi – pointed leafwing
Fountainea glycerium glycerium – angled leafwing
Fountainea glycerium yucatanum – angled leafwing
Fountainea halice martinezi – thorn-scrub leafwing
Fountainea halice maya – Yucatán thorn-scrub leafwing
Fountainea halice tehuana – West-Mexican thorn-scrub leafwing
Fountainea nobilis nobilis – noble leafwing
Fountainea nobilis rayoensis – noble leafwing
Fountainea ryphea ryphea – ryphea leafwing
Hypna clytemnestra mexicana – silver-studded leafwing
Memphis arginussa eubaena – mottled leafwing
Memphis artacaena – white-patched leafwing
Memphis aureola – aureola leafwing
Memphis dia dia – Dia leafwing
Memphis forreri – Forrer's leafwing
Memphis hedemanni – Hedemann's leafwing
Memphis herbacea – herbacea leafwing
Memphis mora orthesia – orthesia leafwing
Memphis moruus boisduvali – Boisduval's leafwing
Memphis neidhoeferi – wavy-edged leafwing
Memphis oenomais – edge leafwing
Memphis perenna perenna – Perenna leafwing
Memphis philumena xenica – orange-striped leafwing
Memphis pithyusa pithyusa – pale-spotted leafwing
Memphis proserpina proserpina – Proserpina leafwing
Memphis schausiana – great leafwing
Memphis wellingi – Welling's leafwing
Memphis xenocles carolina – Carolina leafwing
Siderone galanthis – red-striped leafwing
Siderone syntyche syntyche – red-patched leafwing
Zaretis callidryas – pale leafwing
Zaretis ellops – seasonal leafwing
Zaretis isidora – Isidora leafwing
Zaretis itys itys – Itys leafwing

Preponini
Agrias aedon rodriguezi – great agrias
Agrias amydon lacandona – white-spotted agrias
Agrias amydon oaxacata – white-spotted agrias
Archaeoprepona amphimachus amphiktion – white-spotted prepona
Archaeoprepona amphimachus baroni – white-spotted prepona
Archaeoprepona demophon centralis – one-spotted prepona
Archaeoprepona demophon occidentalis – one-spotted prepona
Archaeoprepona demophoon gulina – two-spotted prepona
Archaeoprepona demophoon mexicana – two-spotted prepona
Archaeoprepona meander phoebus – three-toned prepona
Archaeoprepona phaedra aelia – falcate prepona
Prepona deiphile brooksiana – orange-spotted prepona
Prepona deiphile diaziana – orange-spotted prepona
Prepona deiphile escalantiana – orange-spotted prepona
Prepona deiphile ibarra – orange-spotted prepona
Prepona deiphile lambertoana – orange-spotted prepona
Prepona dexamenus medinai – least prepona
Prepona laertes octavia – yellow-tufted prepona
Prepona pylene philetas – mottled prepona

Morphinae

Morphini
Antirrhea philoctetes casta – northern antirrhea
Morpho helenor montezuma – common morpho
Morpho helenor octavia – common morpho
Morpho helenor guerrerensis – common morpho
Morpho polyphemus polyphemus – white morpho
Morpho polyphemus luna – white morpho
Morpho theseus justitiae – stub-tailed morpho
Morpho theseus oaxacensis – stub-tailed morpho
Morpho theseus schweizeri – stub-tailed morpho

Brassolini
Caligo brasiliensis sulanus – sulanus owl-butterfly
Caligo oedipus fruhstorferi – Fruhstorfer's owl-butterfly
Caligo telamonius memmon – pale owl-butterfly
Caligo uranus – gold-edged owl-butterfly
Dynastor darius stygianus – daring owl-butterfly
Dynastor macrosiris strix – green-eyed owl-butterfly
Eryphanis aesacus aesacus – double-spotted owl-butterfly
Mielkella singularis – singular owl-butterfly
Mimoblepia staudingeri mexicana – Staudinger's owl-butterfly
Narope minor – small owl-butterfly
Narope testacea – brown owl-butterfly
Opsiphanes blythekitzmillerae – Minerva's owl-butterfly
Opsiphanes boisduvallii – orange owl-butterfly
Opsiphanes cassiae mexicana – Cassia's owl-butterfly
Opsiphanes cassina fabricii – split-banded owl-butterfly
Opsiphanes invirae relucens – lowland owl-butterfly
Opsiphanes quiteria quirinus – scalloped owl-butterfly
Opsiphanes tamarindi tamarindi – narrow-banded owl-butterfly

Satyrinae
Cepheuptychia glaucina – dirty-blue satyr
Cercyonis meadii damei – Mead's wood-nymph
Cercyonis meadii melania – Mead's wood-nymph
Cercyonis pegala texana – common wood-nymph
Cercyonis sthenele behrii – Great Basin wood-nymph
Chloreuptychia sericeella – blue-topped satyr
Cissia cleophes – Cleophes satyr
Cissia confusa – confused satyr
Cissia labe – Labe satyr
Cissia palladia – Butler's satyr
Cissia pompilia – plain satyr
Cissia pseudoconfusa – gold-stained satyr
Cissia similis – one-pupil satyr
Cissia terrestris – terrestrial satyr
Cissia themis – two-pupil satyr
Coenonympha tullia california – California ringlet
Cyllopsis caballeroi – cowboy gemmed-satyr
Cyllopsis clinas – falcate gemmed-satyr
Cyllopsis diazi – Diaz's gemmed-satyr
Cyllopsis dospassosi – dos Passos' gemmed-satyr
Cyllopsis gemma freemani – Freeman's gemmed-satyr
Cyllopsis guatemalena – Guatemalan gemmed-satyr
Cyllopsis hedemanni hedemanni – stub-tailed gemmed-satyr
Cyllopsis hedemanni tamaulipensis – stub-tailed gemmed-satyr
Cyllopsis hilaria – two-toned gemmed-satyr
Cyllopsis jacquelineae – Jacqueline's gemmed-satyr
Cyllopsis nayarit – Nayarit gemmed-satyr
Cyllopsis pallens – pallid gemmed-satyr
Cyllopsis parvimaculata – weak-marked gemmed-satyr
Cyllopsis pephredo – big-spiked gemmed-satyr
Cyllopsis perplexa – perplexing gemmed-satyr
Cyllopsis pertepida avicula – canyonland gemmed-satyr
Cyllopsis pertepida intermedia – canyonland gemmed-satyr
Cyllopsis pertepida maniola – canyonland gemmed-satyr
Cyllopsis pertepida pertepida – canyonland gemmed-satyr
Cyllopsis pseudopephredo – Chermock's gemmed-satyr
Cyllopsis pyracmon henshawi (form nabokovi) – Nabokov's satyr
Cyllopsis pyracmon henshawi – Nabokov's satyr
Cyllopsis pyracmon pyracmon – Nabokov's satyr
Cyllopsis schausi – Schaus' gemmed-satyr
Cyllopsis steinhauserorum – Steinhauser's gemmed-satyr
Cyllopsis suivalenoides – big-eyed gemmed-satyr
Cyllopsis suivalens escalantei – Dyar's gemmed-satyr
Cyllopsis suivalens suivalens – Dyar's gemmed-satyr
Cyllopsis whiteorum – dark gemmed-satyr
Cyllopsis windi – Wind's gemmed-satyr
Drucina championi championi – blue-spotted satyr
Eretris maria – Maria's satyr
Euptychia fetna – orange-patched satyr
Euptychia hilara – tawny-cornered satyr
Euptychia jesia – Jesia satyr
Euptychia rubrofasciata – red-webbed satyr
Euptychia westwoodi – Westwood's satyr
Forsterinaria neonympha umbracea – white-dotted satyr
Gyrocheilus patrobas patrobas – red-bordered satyr
Gyrocheilus patrobas tritonia – red-bordered satyr
Hermeuptychia hermes – Hermes satyr
Hermeuptychia sosybius – Carolina satyr
Hermeuptychia hermybius
Lymanopoda cinna – blue-stained satyr
Magneuptychia alcinoe – simple satyr
Magneuptychia libye – blue-gray satyr
Manataria hercyna maculata – white-spotted satyr
Megeuptychia antonoe – Cramer's satyr
Megisto rubricata anabelae – red satyr
Megisto rubricata cheneyorum – red satyr
Megisto rubricata pseudocleophes – red satyr
Megisto rubricata rubricata – red satyr
Megisto rubricata smithorum – red satyr
Oxeoschistus hilara (Guerrero) – dot-banded satyr
Oxeoschistus hilara hilaria – dot-banded satyr
Oxeoschistus tauropolis tauropolis – yellow-patched satyr
Paramacera allyni – Arizona pine-satyr
Paramacera chinanteca – Oaxacan pine-satyr
Paramacera copiosa – Guerrero pine-satyr
Paramacera xicaque rubrosuffusa – Mexican pine-satyr
Paramacera xicaque xicaque – Mexican pine-satyr
Pareuptychia metaleuca metaleuca – white-banded satyr
Pareuptychia ocirrhoe – white satyr
Pedaliodes circumducta – circumducta satyr
Pedaliodes dejecta dejecta – dejected satyr
Pedaliodes napaea – Napaea satyr
Pedaliodes species – West-Mexican satyr
Pierella luna rubecula – moon satyr
Pindis squamistriga – variable satyr
Pseudodebis zimri – Butler's satyr
Pseudomaniola gigas – orange-bordered satyr
Satyrotaygetis satyrina – wide-bordered satyr
Splendeuptychia kendalli – Kendall's satyr
Taygetis inconspicua – inconspicuous satyr
Taygetis kerea – kerea satyr
Taygetis mermeria excavata – great satyr
Taygetis mermeria griseomarginata – great satyr
Taygetis rufomarginata – rufous-margined satyr
Taygetis sosis – Sosis satyr
Taygetis thamyra – Thamyra satyr
Taygetis uncinata – hook-lined satyr
Taygetis uzza – Uzza satyr
Taygetis virgilia – stub-tailed satyr
Taygetis weymeri – Mexican satyr
Yphthimoides renata – Renata satyr
Zischkaia lupita – Lupita's satyr
Zischkaia pellonia – plateau satyr

Hesperiidae

Eudaminae
Achalarus albociliatus albociliatus – white-edged cloudywing
Achalarus casica – desert cloudywing
Achalarus lyciades – hoary edge
Achalarus tehuacana – Tehuacan cloudywing
Achalarus toxeus – coyote cloudywing
Aguna albistria leucogramma – white-striped aguna
Aguna asander asander – gold-spotted aguna
Aguna aurunce hypozonius – Hewitson's aguna
Aguna claxon – emerald aguna
Aguna coeloides – Austin's aguna
Aguna metophis – long-tailed aguna
Astraptes alardus latia – frosted flasher
Astraptes alector hopfferi – Gilbert's flasher
Astraptes anaphus annetta – yellow-tipped flasher
Astraptes apastus apastus – broad-banded flasher
Astraptes aulestis – aulestis flasher
Astraptes brevicauda – short-tailed flasher
Astraptes chiriquensis chiriquensis – Chiriqui flasher
Astraptes creteus crana – whitened flasher
Astraptes egregius egregius – small-spotted flasher
Astraptes enotrus – white-spotted flasher
Astraptes fulgerator azul – two-barred flasher, flashing astraptes
Astraptes janeira – Schaus' flasher
Astraptes latimargo bifascia – green-headed flasher
Astraptes megalurus – long-tailed flasher
Astraptes phalaecus – yellow-edged flasher
Astraptes talus – green flasher
Astraptes tucuti – Tucuti flasher
Astraptes weymeri – Weymer's flasher
Astraptes species – Steinhauser's flasher
Autochton bipunctatus – Gmelin's banded-skipper
Autochton cellus – golden banded-skipper
Autochton cincta – Chisos banded-skipper
Autochton longipennis – spike banded-skipper
Autochton neis – broad banded-skipper
Autochton pseudocellus – Sonoran banded-skipper
Autochton siermadror – East-Mexican banded-skipper
Autochton vectilucis – Central American banded-skipper
Autochton zarex – sharp banded-skipper
Bungalotis astylos – dark-cheeked scarlet-eye
Bungalotis erythus – spotted scarlet-eye
Bungalotis midas – white-cheeked scarlet-eye
Bungalotis milleri – Miller's scarlet-eye
Bungalotis qudratum quadratum – pallid scarlet-eye
Cabares potrillo potrillo – Potrillo skipper
Calliades zeutus – zeutus banded-skipper
Cephise aelius – longtailed scarlet-eye
Cephise guatemalaensis – Guatemalan scarlet-eye
Cephise mexicanus – Mexican scarlet-eye
Cephise nuspesez – Burns' scarlet-eye
Chioides albofasciatus – white-striped longtail
Chioides zilpa – Zilpa longtail
Chrysoplectrum epicincea – stub-tailed skipper
Codatractus alcaeus alcaeus – white-crescent mottled-skipper
Codatractus arizonensis – Arizona mottled-skipper
Codatractus bryaxis – golden mottled-skipper
Codatractus carlos carlos – Carlos' mottled-skipper
Codatractus cyda – cyda mottled-skipper
Codatractus cyledis – cyledis mottled-skipper
Codatractus hyster – hyster skipper
Codatractus melon – melon mottled-skipper
Codatractus sallyae – Sally's mottled-skipper
Codatractus uvydixa – variable mottled-skipper
Codatractus valeriana – valeriana skipper
Codatractus yucatanus – Yucatán mottled-skipper
Cogia aventinus – trimmed skipper
Cogia caicus caicus – gold-costa skipper
Cogia caicus moschus – gold-costa skipper
Cogia cajeta cajeta – yellow-haired skipper
Cogia cajeta eluina – darkened yellow-haired skipper
Cogia calchas – mimosa skipper
Cogia hippalus hippalus – acacia skipper
Cogia hippalus hiska – East-Mexican acacia skipper
Cogia hippalus peninsularis – Baja acacia skipper
Cogia mala – Guatemalan skipper
Cogia outis – Outis skipper
Drephalys dumeril – Dumeril skipper
Drephalys oria – Oria skipper
Drephalys oriander – oriander skipper
Dyscophellus nicephorus – two-spotted scarlet-eye
Dyscophellus phraxanor lama – big-spotted scarlet-eye
Dyscophellus porcius porcius – fiery scarlet-eye
Dyscophellus ramusis ramon – plain scarlet-eye
Entheus crux – Mexican entheus
Entheus matho matho – giant entheus
Epargyreus aspina – spineless silverdrop
Epargyreus brodkorbi – barely-spotted silverdrop
Epargyreus clarus californicus – California silver-spotted skipper
Epargyreus clarus clarus – silver-spotted skipper
Epargyreus clarus huachuca – Arizona silver-spotted skipper
Epargyreus clavicornis gaumeri – small-spotted silverdrop
Epargyreus deleoni – long-spotted silverdrop
Epargyreus exadeus cruza – broken silverdrop
Epargyreus socus orizaba – round-spotted silverdrop
Epargyreus spina spina – spined silverdrop
Epargyreus spinosa – suffused silverdrop
Epargyreus windi – Wind's silverdrop
Hyalothyrus neleus pemphigargyra – dimorphic skipper
Naracosius samson – Samson flasher
Narcosius colossus colossus – colossal flasher
Narcosius nazaraeus – Nazareus flasher
Narcosius parisi helen – steely flasher
Nascus broteas – Broteas scarlet-eye
Nascus paulliniae – least scarlet-eye
Nascus phintias – Schaus' scarlet-eye
Nascus phocus – common scarlet-eye
Nascus solon corilla – Corilla scarlet-eye
Ocyba calathana calanus – yellow-rimmed scarlet-eye
Phanus albiapicalis – white-tipped phanus
Phanus confusis – confusing phanus
Phanus marshallii – common phanus
Phanus obscurior obscurior – dark phanus
Phanus rilma – West-Mexican phanus
Phanus vitreus – widespread phanus
Phocides belus – Belus skipper
Phocides pigmalion pigmalion – Pigmalion skipper
Phocides polybius lilea – guava skipper
Phocides thermus thermus – Thermus skipper
Phocides urania urania – Urania skipper
Polygonus leo arizonensis – hammock skipper
Polygonus savigny savigny – Manuel's skipper
Polythrix asine – Asine longtail
Polythrix auginus – Auginus longtail
Polythrix caunus – four-spotted longtail
Polythrix kanshul – Kanshul longtail
Polythrix metallescens – metallescens skipper
Polythrix mexicanus – Mexican longtail
Polythrix octomaculata – eight-spotted longtail
Proteides mercurius mercurius – Mercurial skipper
Ridens allyni – Allyn's ridens
Ridens crison crison – many-spotted ridens
Ridens mephitis – Hewitson's ridens
Ridens mercedes – white-tailed ridens
Ridens miltas – Mexican ridens
Ridens toddi – Todd's skipper
Spathilepia clonius – falcate skipper
Telemiades avitus – yellow-spotted telemiades
Telemiades choricus – Mexican telemiades
Telemiades delalande – Delalande skipper
Telemiades fides – small telemiades
Telemiades megallus – orange telemiades
Telemiades nicomedes – dark telemiades
Thessia jalapus – jalapus cloudywing
Thorybes drusius – Drusius cloudywing, white-fringed cloudywing
Thorybes mexicana dobra – Mexican cloudywing
Thorybes mexicana mexicana – Mexican cloudywing
Thorybes pylades albosuffusa – northern cloudywing
Thorybes pylades indistinctus – northern cloudywing
Thorybes pylades pylades – northern cloudywing
Typhedanus ampyx – gold-tufted skipper
Typhedanus salas – Salas skipper
Typhedanus undulatus – mottled longtail
Udranomia kikkawai – nervous skipper
Udranomia orcinus – Orcinus skipper
Urbanus albimargo albimargo – white-edged longtail
Urbanus belli – Bell's longtail
Urbanus dorantes calafia – Dorantes longtail
Urbanus dorantes dorantes – Dorantes longtail
Urbanus doryssus chales – white-tailed longtail
Urbanus esmeraldus – Esmeralda longtail
Urbanus esta – esta longtail
Urbanus evona – turquoise longtail
Urbanus procne – brown longtail
Urbanus prodicus – montane longtail
Urbanus pronta – spot-banded longtail
Urbanus pronus – pronus longtail
Urbanus proteus proteus – long-tailed skipper
Urbanus simplicius – plain longtail
Urbanus tanna – Tanna longtail
Urbanus teleus – Teleus longtail
Urbanus velinus – Velinus skipper
Urbanus viridis – rare longtail
Urbanus viterboana – bluish longtail
Venada species – cryptic scarlet-eye
Zestusa dorus – short-tailed skipper (northern zestusa)
Zestusa elwesi – Mexican zestusa
Zestusa levona – Levona's zestusa
Zestusa staudingeri – southern zestusa
Zestusa species – Transvolcanic zestusa
Zestusa species – unfolded zestusa

Pyrginae

Pyrrhopygini
Amysoria galgala – red-banded firetip
Apyrrothrix araxes araxes – Araxes skipper
Apyrrothrix araxes arizonae – Arizona Araxes skipper
Azonax typhaon – Typhaon skipper
Chalypyge chalybea chalybea – orange-rimmed skipper
Chalypyge chalybea chloris – orange-rimmed skipper
Elbella miodesmiata – Rober's skipper
Elbella patrobas mexicana – Patrobas skipper
Elbella scylla – Scylla firetip
Jemadia pseudognetus – dot-collared skipper
Jonaspyge jonas – scallop-edged firetip
Jonaspyge tzotzili – Freeman's firetip
Melanopyge erythrosticta – red-dotted skipper
Melanopyge hoffmanni – Hoffmann's skipper
Melanopyge mulleri – red-spotted skipper
Melanopyge species
Myscelus amystis hages – widespread myscelus
Myscelus assaricus michaeli – fiery myscelus
Myscelus belti – Belt's myscelus
Myscelus perissodora – Dyar's myscelus
Mysoria affinis – red-collared firetip
Mysoria amra – blue-collared firetip
Mysoria barcatus ambigua – ambigua firetip
Oxynetra hopfferi – Hopffer's firetip
Parelbella macleannani – Macleannan's skipper
Pyrrhopyge crida – white-banded firetip
Pyrrhopyge zenodorus – red-headed firetip
Zonia zonia pama – Pama skipper

Celaenorrhinini
Celaenorrhinus cynapes cynapes – small flat
Celaenorrhinus fritzgaertneri – Fritzgaertner's flat
Celaenorrhinus monartus – dotted flat
Celaenorrhinus stallingsi – Stallings' flat
Celaenorrhinus stola – stola flat

Carcharodini
Arteurotia tractipennis tractipennis – starred skipper
Bolla brennus brennus – obscure sootywing
Bolla clytius – mottled sootywing
Bolla cupreiceps – copper-headed sootywing
Bolla cybele – Veracruzan sootywing
Bolla cyclops – Cyclops sootywing
Bolla cylindus – checkered sootywing
Bolla eusebius – spatulate sootywing
Bolla evippe – rough-tipped sootywing
Bolla fenestra – Oaxacan sootywing
Bolla guerra – Guerrero sootywing
Bolla imbras – rounded sootywing
Bolla litus – many-spotted sootywing
Bolla oriza – Orizaba sootywing
Bolla orsines – hook-tipped sootywing
Bolla solitaria – solitary sootywing
Bolla subapicatus – fin-tipped sootywing
Bolla zorilla – zorilla sootywing
Cyclosemia anastomosis – northern eyed-skipper
Hesperopsis alpheus alpheus – saltbush sootywing
Hesperopsis alpheus texana – saltbush sootywing
Hesperopsis gracielae – MacNeill's sootywing
Hesperopsis libya libya – Mojave sootywing
Mictris crispus caerula – crisp skipper
Mimia chiapaensis – Chiapan skipper
Mimia phidyle phidyle – Phidyle skipper
Myrinia myris – Myris skipper
Myrinia raymundo – Raymundo's skipper
Nisoniades castolus – Castolus tufted-skipper
Nisoniades ephora – ephora tufted-skipper
Nisoniades godma – godma tufted-skipper
Nisoniades laurentina – dark tufted-skipper
Nisoniades macarius – Macarius tufted-skipper
Nisoniades rubescens – purplish tufted-skipper
Noctuana lactifera bipuncta – cryptic skipper
Noctuana stator – red-studded skipper
Pachyneuria licisca – immaculate tufted-skipper
Pellicia angra angra – rare tufted-skipper
Pellicia arina – glazed tufted-skipper
Pellicia dimidiata – morning glory tufted-skipper
Pholisora catullus – common sootywing
Pholisora mejicanus – Mexican sootywing
Polyctor cleta – Cleta tufted-skipper
Polyctor enops – Enops tufted-skipper
Staphylus ascalaphus – Central American sootywing
Staphylus azteca – Aztec sootywing
Staphylus ceos – golden-headed sootywing
Staphylus iguala – Iguala sootywing
Staphylus lenis – lenis sootywing
Staphylus mazans – Mazans sootywing
Staphylus tepeca – grizzled sootywing
Staphylus tierra – West-Mexican sootywing
Staphylus vincula – mountain sootywing
Staphylus vulgata – golden-snouted sootywing
Windia windi – Wind's skipper

Erynnini
Anastrus luctuosus – West-Mexican anastrus
Anastrus meliboea meliboea – scarce anastrus
Anastrus neaeris neaeris – brilliant anastrus
Anastrus petius peto – Peto skipper
Anastrus sempiternus sempiternus – common anastrus
Anastrus tolimus tolimus – blurry anastrus
Anastrus virens albopannus – Austin's anastrus
Camptopleura auxo – Auxo bent-skipper
Camptopleura oaxaca – Oaxacan bent-skipper
Camptopleura theramenes – Mabille's bent-skipper
Chiomara georgina georgina – white-patched skipper
Chiomara georgina pelagica – white-patched skipper
Chiomara mithrax – mithrax duskywing
Cycloglypha thrasibulus thrasibulus – widespread bent-skipper
Cycloglypha tisias – Tisias bent-skipper
Ebrietas anacreon anacreon – common bent-skipper
Ebrietas elaudia livius – plain bent-skipper
Ebrietas evanidus – blurred bent-skipper
Ebrietas osyris – yellow-patched bent-skipper
Ebrietas sappho – sappho bent-skipper
Erynnis afranius – Afranius duskywing
Erynnis brizo brizo – sleepy duskywing
Erynnis brizo burgessi – Rocky Mountain sleepy duskywing
Erynnis brizo lacustra – Lacustra sleepy duskywing
Erynnis brizo mulleri – white-fringed sleepy duskywing
Erynnis funeralis – funereal duskywing
Erynnis horatius – Horace's duskywing
Erynnis juvenalis clitus – Clitus duskywing
Erynnis juvenalis juvenalis – Juvenal's duskywing
Erynnis mercurius – Mexican duskywing
Erynnis meridianus fieldi – white-fringed meridian duskywing
Erynnis meridianus meridianus – meridian duskywing
Erynnis pacuvius callidus – Californian Pacuvius duskywing
Erynnis pacuvius pacuvius – Pacuvius duskywing
Erynnis propertius – Propertius duskywing
Erynnis scudderi – Scudder's duskywing
Erynnis tristis pattersoni – dark-fringed mournful duskywing
Erynnis tristis tatius – Mexican mournful duskywing
Erynnis tristis tristis – mournful duskywing
Gesta invisus – false duskywing
Gorgythion begga pyralina – variegated skipper
Gorgythion vox – crab's-claw skipper
Grais stigmaticus stigmaticus – hermit skipper
Helias cama – squared bent-skipper
Mylon ander – narrow-winged mylon
Mylon cajus hera – cryptic mylon
Mylon cristata – Austin's mylon
Mylon jason – Jason's mylon
Mylon lassia – bold mylon
Mylon maimon – common mylon
Mylon pelopidas – pale mylon
Mylon salvia – Evans' mylon
Potamanaxas unifasciata – Felder's skipper
Sostrata nordica – blue-studded skipper
Theagenes aegides – white-centered bent-skipper
Timochares ruptifasciata – brown-banded skipper
Timochares trifasciata trifasciata – many-banded skipper
Tosta gorgus – Gorgus skipper
Tosta platypterus – platypterus skipper

Achlyodidini
Achlyodes busirus heros – giant sicklewing
Achlyodes pallida – pale sicklewing
Aethilla chiapa – highlands skipper
Aethilla echina echina – echina skipper
Aethilla lavochrea – yellow-rimmed skipper
Atarnes sallei – orange-spotted skipper
Doberes anticus – dark doberes
Doberes hewitsonius – pale doberes
Doberes sobrinus – West-Mexican doberes
Eantis tamenund – northern sicklewing (sickle-winged skipper)
Eantis thraso – southern sicklewing
Gindanes brebisson panaetius – white-trailed skipper
Gindanes brontinus brontinus – straight-edged skipper
Ouleus bubaris – Bubaris skipper
Ouleus cyrna – hidden-yellow skipper
Ouleus salvina – Salvin's skipper
Pythonides grandis assecla – many-spotted blue-skipper
Pythonides jovianus amaryllis – variable blue-skipper
Pythonides mundo – Freeman's blue-skipper
Pythonides proxenus – proxenus blue-skipper
Pythonides pteras – narrow-winged blue-skipper
Pythonides rosa – Steinhauser's blue-skipper
Quadrus cerialis – common blue-skipper
Quadrus contubernalis anicius – Guatemalan' striped blue-skipper
Quadrus contubernalis contubernalis – striped blue-skipper
Quadrus francesius – Chiapan blue-skipper
Quadrus lugubris – tanned blue-skipper
Zera belti – belti skipper
Zera difficilis – difficult skipper
Zera eboneus – eboneus skipper
Zera hyacinthinius hyacinthinus – bruised skipper
Zera phila hosta – hosta skipper
Zera tetrastigma tetrastigma – tetrastigma skipper

Pyrgini
Anisochoria bacchus – northern snout-skipper
Antigonus corrosus – small spurwing
Antigonus emorsa – white spurwing
Antigonus erosus – common spurwing
Antigonus funebris – West-Mexican spurwing
Antigonus nearchus – large spurwing
Carrhenes calidius – rain-forest hoary-skipper
Carrhenes callipetes – cloud-forest hoary-skipper
Carrhenes canescens canescens – hoary skipper
Carrhenes fuscescens fuscescens – tanned hoary-skipper
Celotes limpia – West-Texas streaky-skipper
Celotes nessus – common streaky-skipper
Clito aberrans – northern clito
Clito zelotes – Hewitson's clito
Diaeus varna – camouflaged skipper
Eracon paulinus – tear-drop skipper
Heliopetes alana – Alana white-skipper
Heliopetes arsalte – veined white-skipper
Heliopetes ericetorum – northern white-skipper
Heliopetes laviana laviana – Laviana white-skipper
Heliopetes macaira macaira – Turk's-cap white-skipper
Heliopyrgus domicella domicella – Erichson's white-skipper
Heliopyrgus sublinea – East-Mexican white-skipper
Onenses hyalophora – crystal-winged skipper
Paches loxus gloriosus – glorious blue-skipper
Paches polla – polla blue-skipper
Pyrgus adepta – Central American checkered-skipper
Pyrgus albescens – white checkered-skipper
Pyrgus communis – common checkered-skipper
Pyrgus oileus – tropical checkered-skipper
Pyrgus orcus – Orcus checkered-skipper
Pyrgus philetas – desert checkered-skipper
Pyrgus scriptura apertorum – small checkered-skipper
Systasea microsticta – rare spurwing
Systasea pulverulenta – Texas powdered-skipper
Systasea zampa – Arizona powdered-skipper
xenophanes tryxus – glassy-winged skipper
Zobera albopunctata – Coliman zobera
Zobera marginata – western zobera
Zobera oaxaquena – Oaxacan zobera
Zopyrion sandace – sandy skipper

Heteropterinae
Dalla bubobon – bubobon skipperling
Dalla dividuum – Dyar's skipperling
Dalla faula – West-Mexican skipperling
Dalla freemani – Freeman's skipperling
Dalla kemneri – Pelon skipperling
Dalla lalage – Godman's skipperling
Dalla lethaea – Schaus' skipperling
Dalla ligilla – ligilla skipperling
Dalla mentor – Guerrero skipperling
Dalla nubes – Chiapan skipperling
Dalla ramirezi – gold-rayed skipperling
Dalla steinhauseri – Steinhauser's skipperling
Dardarina dardaris – Dardaris skipperling
Piruna aea aea – many-spotted skipperling
Piruna aea mexicana – many-spotted skipperling
Piruna brunnea – chocolate skipperling
Piruna ceracates – Veracruz skipperling
Piruna cyclosticta – plateau skipperling
Piruna dampfi – violet-dusted skipperling
Piruna gyrans – variable skipperling
Piruna haferniki – Chisos skipperling
Piruna jonka – Oaxacan skipperling
Piruna kemneri – Kemner's skipperling
Piruna maculata – Sinaloan skipperling
Piruna microsticta – Southwest-Mexican skipperling
Piruna millerorum – Millers' skipperling
Piruna mullinsi – Mullins' skipperling
Piruna penaea – hour-glass skipperling
Piruna polingii – four-spotted skipperling
Piruna purepecha – Purepecha skipperling
Piruna roeveri – Roever's skipperling
Piruna sina – fine-spotted skipperling

Hesperiinae

Incertae sedis
Adlerodea petrovna – Petrovna skipper
Amblyscirtes aenus erna – bronze roadside-skipper
Amblyscirtes aenus megamacula – bronze roadside-skipper
Amblyscirtes anubis – half-edged roadside-skipper
Amblyscirtes brocki – Brock's roadside-skipper
Amblyscirtes cassus – cassus roadside-skipper
Amblyscirtes celia – Celia's roadside-skipper
Amblyscirtes elissa arizonae – Elissa roadside-skipper
Amblyscirtes elissa elissa – Elissa roadside-skipper
Amblyscirtes eos – dotted roadside-skipper
Amblyscirtes exoteria – large roadside-skipper
Amblyscirtes fimbriata fimbriata – orange-edged roadside-skipper
Amblyscirtes fimbriata pallida – white-edged roadside-skipper
Amblyscirtes fluonia – brassy roadside-skipper
Amblyscirtes folia – larger roadside-skipper
Amblyscirtes nereus – slaty roadside-skipper
Amblyscirtes novimmaculatus – immaculate roadside-skipper
Amblyscirtes nysa – Nysa roadside-skipper
Amblyscirtes oslari – Oslar's roadside-skipper
Amblyscirtes patriciae – Patricia's roadside-skipper
Amblyscirtes phylace – orange-headed roadside-skipper
Amblyscirtes raphaeli – giant roadside-skipper
Amblyscirtes texanae – Texas roadside-skipper
Amblyscirtes tolteca prenda – Toltec roadside-skipper
Amblyscirtes tolteca tolteca – Toltec roadside-skipper
Anthoptus epictetus – trailside skipper
Anthoptus inculta – inculta skipper
Anthoptus insignis – immaculate skipper
Anthoptus macalpinei – McAlpine's skipper
Arita arita – arita skipper
Callimormus juventus – Juventus skipper
Callimormus radiola radiola – radiant skipper
Callimormus saturnus – Saturnus skipper
Cantha roraimae – Roraima skipper
Cobalopsis autumna – autumna skipper
Cobalopsis nero – Nero skipper
Corticea corticea – redundant skipper
Corticea lysias lysias – Lysias skipper
Corticea similea – similar skipper
Cymaenes alumna – alumna skipper
Cymaenes fraus – frosty-banded skipper
Cymaenes laurelolus laureolus – Laureolus skipper
Cymaenes theogenis – Theogenis skipper
Cymaenes trebius – fawn-spotted skipper
Enosis achelous – ferruginous skipper
Enosis immaculata immaculata – immaculata skipper
Enosis matheri – Mather's skipper
Eprius veleda veleda – Veleda skipper
Eutocus facilis – facilis skipper
Eutychide complana – compliant skipper
Eutychide paria – gold-dot skipper
Eutychide subcordata ochus – Ochus skipper
Falga sciras – Sciras skipper
Flaccilla aecas – aecas ruby-eye
Halotus jonaveriorum – John-and-Avery's skipper
Halotus rica – Costa Rican skipper
Inglorius mediocris – mediocre skipper
Joanna joanna – Joanna's skipper
Justinia norda – false saliana
Lento hermione hermione – Hermione skipper
Lerema accius accius – clouded skipper
Lerema liris – Liris skipper
Lerema lumina – overcast skipper
Lerodea arabus – violet-clouded skipper
Lerodea eufala eufala – Eufala skipper
Lycas argentea – silvered ruby-eye
Methion melas – rusty skipper
Methionopsis dolor – dolor skipper
Methionopsis ina – Ina skipper
Methionopsis typhon – Typhon skipper
Mnaseas bicolor – dull skipper
Mnasicles geta – violet-frosted skipper
Mnasicles hicetaon – gray skipper
Mnasilus allubita – Butler's skipper
Mnasinous patage – black-veined skipper
Mnasitheus cephoides – cephoides skipper
Mnasitheus chrysophrys – chrysophrys skipper
Mnasitheus nitra – Nitra skipper
Moeris hyagnis hyagnis – Hyagnis skipper
Moeris striga stroma – flag skipper
Monca crispinus – violet-patched skipper
Monca jera – jera skipper
Monca telata – Telata skipper
Morys lyde – violet-studded skipper
Morys micythus – Micythus skipper
Morys valda – Valda skipper
Mucia zygia – black-dotted skipper
Naevolus orius – Orius skipper
Nastra julia – Julia's skipper
Nastra leucone leucone – Leucone skipper
Niconiades comitana – Comitana skipper
Niconiades incomptus – half-tailed skipper
Niconiades nikko – Nikko skipper
Niconiades viridis vista – vista skipper
Onophas columbaria columbaria – blue-glossed skipper
Orses cynisca – yellow-edged ruby-eye
Papias dictys – bottom-spotted skipper
Papias phaeomelas – Hubner's skipper
Papias phainis – somber skipper
Papias subcostulata – jungle skipper
Paracarystus hypargyra – hypargyra skipper
Parphorus decora – decora skipper
Parphorus storax – storax skipper
Parphorus species – Nayarit skipper
Parphorus species – Tamaulipas skipper
Perichares lotus – lotus ruby-eye
Perichares philetes adela – green-backed ruby-eye
Phanes aletes – jeweled skipper
Phanes almoda – almoda skipper
Pheraeus covadonga covadonga – eastern Covadonga skipper
Pheraeus covadonga loxicha – western Covadonga skipper
Phlebodes campo sifax – Sifax skipper
Remella duena – Guatemalan remella
Remella remus – black-spot remella
Remella rita – Rita's remella
Remella vopiscus – cryptic remella
Repens florus – false roadside-skipper
Rhinthon osca – Osca skipper
Saturnus reticulata obscurus – Bell's skipper
Styriodes dedecora – dedecora skipper
Sucova sucova – Sucova skipper
Synapte pecta – northern faceted-skipper
Synapte salenus – Salenus faceted-skipper
Synapte shiva – faded faceted-skipper
Synapte silius – rain-forest faceted-skipper
Synapte silna – Southwest-Mexican faceted-skipper
Synapte syraces – bold faceted-skipper
Thargella caura caura – round-winged skipper
Thoon modius – moody skipper
Tigasis nausiphanes – cloud-forest skipper
Tigasis simplex – simple skipper
Vehilius inca – Inca skipper
Vehilius stictomenes illudens – pasture skipper
Vertica ibis – ibis skipper
Vertica subrufescens – subrufescens skipper
Vertica verticalis coatepeca – vertical skipper
Vettius coryna argentus – Chiapan silver-plated skipper
Vettius coryna conka – silver-plated skipper
Vettius fantasos – fantastic skipper
Vettius lafrenaye pica – two-toned skipper
Vettius marcus – Marcus skipper
Vettius onaca – Onaca skipper
Vettius tertianus – blurry skipper
Vidius perigenes – pale-rayed skipper
Vinius tryhana tryhana – gold-washed skipper
Vinpeius tinga – Freeman's skipper
Virga clenchi – Clench's skipper
Virga virginius – Virginius skipper
Zariaspes mys – mys skipper
Zariaspes mythecus – Godman's skipper

Megathymini
Aegiale hesperiaris – tequila giant-skipper
Agathymus aryxna – Arizona giant-skipper
Agathymus belli – Bell's giant-skipper
Agathymus comstocki – Comstock's giant-skipper
Agathymus dawsoni – Dawson's giant-skipper
Agathymus escalantei – Escalante's giant-skipper
Agathymus estelleae estelleae – Estelle's giant-skipper
Agathymus evansi – Huachuca giant-skipper
Agathymus fieldi – Field's giant-skipper
Agathymus hoffmanni – Hoffmann's giant-skipper
Agathymus indecisa – Guatemalan giant-skipper
Agathymus juliae – Julia's giant-skipper
Agathymus mariae – Mary's giant-skipper
Agathymus micheneri – Michener's giant-skipper
Agathymus neumoegeni – Neumoegen's giant-skipper
Agathymus remingtoni – Remington's giant-skipper
Agathymus rethon – black giant-skipper
Agathymus ricei – Rice's giant-skipper
Agathymus stephensi – California giant-skipper
Agathymus species
Megathymus beulahae beulahae – broad-banded giant-skipper
Megathymus beulahae gayleae – broad-banded giant-skipper
Megathymus ursus ursus – ursine giant-skipper
Megathymus ursus violae – ursine giant-skipper
Megathymus yuccae arizonae – yucca giant-skipper
Megathymus yuccae harbisoni – yucca giant-skipper
Megathymus yuccae louiseae – yucca giant-skipper
Megathymus yuccae reubeni – yucca giant-skipper
Megathymus yuccae wilsonorum – yucca giant-skipper
Stallingsia jacki – Chiapan giant-skipper
Stallingsia maculosus – Manfreda giant-skipper
Stallingsia smithi – Smith's giant-skipper
Turnerina hazelae – Guerrero giant-skipper
Turnerina mejicanus – Turner's giant-skipper

Hesperiini
Adopaeoides bistriata – silver-rayed skipper
Adopaeoides prittwitzi – sunrise skipper
Aides brilla – brilliant silverpatch
Aides dysoni – Dyson's silverpatch
Anatrytone logan lagus – Delaware skipper
Anatrytone mazai – De la Maza's skipper
Anatrytone mella – Mella skipper
Anatrytone potosiensis – Potosi skipper
Ancyloxypha arene – tropical least skipper
Ancyloxypha numitor – least skipper
Argon lota – argon skipper
Atalopedes campestris campestris – sachem
Atalopedes campestris huron – sachem
Atrytonopsis cestus – cestus skipper
Atrytonopsis deva – Deva skipper
Atrytonopsis edwardsii – sheep skipper
Atrytonopsis frappenda – Pedegral skipper
Atrytonopsis lunus – moon-marked skipper
Atrytonopsis ovinia – Ovinia skipper
Atrytonopsis pittacus – white-barred skipper
Atrytonopsis python – python skipper
Atrytonopsis vierecki – Viereck's skipper
Atrytonopsis zweifeli – Zweifel's skipper
Calpodes ethlius – Brazilian skipper
Carystoides abrahami – Abraham's ruby-eye
Carystoides basoches – basoches ruby-eye
Carystoides escalantei – Escalante's ruby-eye
Carystoides floresi – Freeman's ruby-eye
Carystoides hondura – Honduran ruby-eye
Carystoides lila – Lila ruby-eye
Carystoides mexicana – Mexican ruby-eye
Carystoides sicania orbius – yellow-spotted ruby-eye
Carystus phorcus phorcus – white-patched ruby-eye
Cobalus virbius fidicula – white-centered ruby-eye
Conga chydaea – hidden-ray skipper
Copaeodes aurantiaca – orange skipperling
Copaeodes minima – southern skipperling
Cynea anthracinus – anthracinus skipper
Cynea corope – corope skipper
Cynea cynea – cynea skipper
Cynea diluta – diluted skipper
Cynea irma – fogged skipper
Cynea megalops – megalops skipper
Cynea nigricola – nigricola skipper
Damas clavus – violet-washed skipper
Decinea decinea huasteca – Huastecan skipper
Decinea lucifer – Lucifer skipper
Decinea mustea – Muste skipper
Decinea percosius – double-dotted skipper
Decinea rindgei – Rindge's skipper
Dubiella fiscella belpa – yellow-striped ruby-eye
Ebusus ebusus nigrior – Ebusus skipper
Euphyes ampa – ampa skipper
Euphyes antra – Antra skipper
Euphyes canda – Candelaria skipper
Euphyes chamuli – Chamul skipper
Euphyes dion – Dion skipper
Euphyes peneia – guardpost skipper
Euphyes vestris harbisoni – dun skipper
Euphyes vestris metacomet – dun skipper
Hesperia colorado leussleri – western branded skipper
Hesperia juba – Juba skipper
Hesperia pahaska (Baja California Norte) – Pahaska skipper
Hesperia pahaska williamsi – Pahaska skipper
Hesperia uncas gilberti – Uncas skipper
Hesperia uncas lasus – Uncas skipper
Hesperia uncas uncas – Uncas skipper
Hesperia viridis – green skipper
Hesperia woodgatei – Apache skipper
Hylephila phyleus phyleus – fiery skipper
Librita heras – heras skipper
Librita librita – librita skipper
Lindra brasus – Brasus skipper
Lychnuchoides saptine – golden-banded ruby-eye
Metron chrysogastra chrysogastra – orange-headed metron
Metron zimra – olive metron
Neoxeniades luda – Luda skipper
Neoxeniades molion – blue-based skipper
Notamblyscirtes simius – simius skipper
Nyctelius nyctelius nyctelius – violet-banded skipper, nyctelius skipper
Oarisma edwardsii – Edwards' skipperling
Oarisma era – bold-veined skipperling
Oarisma garita calega – garita skipperling
Ochlodes agricola agricola – rural skipper
Ochlodes samenta – Samenta skipper
Ochlodes sylvanoides sylvanoides – woodland skipper
Oeonus pyste – Veracruzan skipper
Onespa nubis – nubis skipper
Orthos gabina – Gabina skipper
Orthos lycortas – Lycortas skipper
Oxynthes corusca – corusca skipper
Panoquina errans – wandering skipper
Panoquina evadnes – Evadnes skipper
Panoquina evansi – Evans' skipper
Panoquina hecebolus – Hecebolus skipper
Panoquina lucas – purple-washed skipper
Panoquina ocola ocola – ocola skipper
Panoquina panoquinoides panoquinoides – beach skipper
Panoquina pauper pauper – pauper skipper
Paratrytone aphractoia – snowball-spotted skipper
Paratrytone decepta – Morelos skipper
Paratrytone gala – Gala skipper
Paratrytone kemneri – Kemner's skipper
Paratrytone omiltemensis – Omiltemi skipper
Paratrytone pilza – Pilza skipper
Paratrytone polyclea – Polyclea skipper
Paratrytone raspa – raspa skipper
Paratrytone rhexenor – crazy-spotted skipper
Paratrytone snowi – Snow's skipper
Phemiades species – phemiades skipper
Poanes benito – Benito's skipper
Poanes inimica – yellow-stained skipper
Poanes melane melane – umber skipper
Poanes melane poa – Central American umber skipper
Poanes melane vitellina – Mexican umber skipper
Poanes monticola – oyamel skipper
Poanes niveolimbus – snow-fringed skipper
Poanes taxiles – Taxiles skipper
Poanes ulphila – ulphila skipper
Poanes zabulon – Zabulon skipper
Polites carus – Carus skipper
Polites norae – Guaymas skipper
Polites pupillus – pupilled skipper
Polites puxillius – Mabille's skipper
Polites rhesus – rhesus skipper
Polites sabuleti margaretae – sandhill skipper
Polites sabuleti sabuleti – sandhill skipper
Polites sonora sonora – Sonoran skipper
Polites subreticulata – subreticulate skipper
Polites vibex praeceps – whirlabout
Pompeius dares – Dares skipper
Pompeius pompeius – Pompeius skipper
Pompeius verna sequoyah – little glassywing
Pseudocopaeodes eunus eunus – alkali skipper
Quasimellana agnesae – coastal mellana
Quasimellana andersoni – Anderson's mellana
Quasimellana aurora – bright mellana
Quasimellana balsa – sullied mellana
Quasimellana eulogius – common mellana
Quasimellana fieldi – Field's mellana
Quasimellana mexicana – Mexican mellana
Quasimellana mulleri – Muller's mellana
Quasimellana myron – greenish mellana
Quasimellana nayana – Nayarit mellana
Quasimellana servilius – green mellana
Quasimellana siblinga – sibling mellana
Quinta cannae – Canna skipper
Saliana antoninus – persistent saliana
Saliana esperi esperi – perching saliana
Saliana fusta – suffused saliana
Saliana hewitsoni – green saliana
Saliana longirostris – shy saliana
Saliana saladin saladin – violet-tipped saliana
Saliana salius – sullied saliana
Saliana severus – dark saliana
Saliana triangularis – triangular saliana
Stinga morrisoni – Morrison's skipper
Synale cynaxa – black-veined ruby-eye
Talides alternata – alternate ruby-eye
Talides cantra – cantra ruby-eye
Talides sergestus – Sergestus ruby-eye
Telles arcalaus – yellow-spotted ruby-eye
Thespieus aspernatus – aspernatus skipper
Thespieus dalman – chalk-marked skipper
Thespieus macareus – chestnut-marked skipper
Thracides phidon – jewel-studded skipper
Thracides thrasea – Thrasea skipper
Tirynthia conflua – conflua skipper
Tromba xanthura – yellow-washed ruby-eye
Turesis complanula – complanula skipper
Turesis tabascoensis – Tabasco skipper
Turesis theste – Theste skipper
Vacerra cervara – Cervara skipper
Vacerra gayra – gayra skipper
Vacerra litana – Litana skipper
Wallengrenia otho clavus – pale southern broken-dash
Wallengrenia otho otho – southern broken-dash
Xeniades chalestra pteras – band-spotted skipper
Xeniades orchamus orchamus – smear-spotted skipper
Zenis jebus hemizona – purple-stained skipper
Zenis minos – Minos skipper

References

Blogspot.nl: Mariposas Mexicanas

 
Butterflies
M
Mexico
Mexico